Bramber was a railway station in England on the Steyning Line which served the village of Bramber. The station was patronised by tourists visiting nearby Bramber Castle, Potter's Museum and the village. In order to accommodate the special excursion trains the station platforms were extra long.

The railway closed as a result of the Beeching Axe in 1966. Nothing remains of the station today, which now forms part of a traffic roundabout.

Gallery

See also 
 List of closed railway stations in Britain

References 

Disused railway stations in West Sussex
Railway stations in Great Britain opened in 1861
Railway stations in Great Britain closed in 1966
Beeching closures in England
1861 establishments in England
Former London, Brighton and South Coast Railway stations